Yevgeni Markov (1769 in Moscow – 1828), was a Russian infantry commander during the French Revolutionary Wars and the Napoleonic Wars.

Career
Born to a noble family in the Moscow gubernia, Markov enlisted as a private in the Permsk Infantry Regiment on 16 December 1770, and was made ensign on 29 November 1772. On 29 June 1788 he was promoted to second major, and participated in the Russo-Turkish War, serving under Alexander Suvorov commanding the 2nd line at Kinburn 13 October. He was awarded a golden cross and the Order of St. George (4th class) during the Siege of Ochakov on 11 April 1792, where he was wounded in the head. After recovery he was made a premier major in the Apsheron Infantry Regiment in 1792, serving in the Polish Campaign of 1792-1794 and seeing action at Gorodische, Dubenky, and Praga. In 1796 he participated in the Persian Expedition. Promoted to colonel on 15 April 1798, he was given command of the Tiflis Musketeer Regiment on 27 August 1798. On 7 October 1798 he was promoted Major General, and appointed chief of the Muromansk Infantry Regiment on 8 December.

In 1799 he commanded a Brigade of Durasov's Division under Alexander Korsakov in Switzerland. At the Second Battle of Zurich on 25 September he faced the initial French crossing of the Limmat, where he was grievously wounded and taken prisoner. Briefly retired from November 1799 to October 1800, he was appointed commandant of Arensborg on 8 February 1801.

1807 Campaign

In January 1807 he commanded one of the three advance guards (Right Wing) under Bennigsen in Poland. On 24 January he surprised & defeated a detachment of Bernadotte’s Corps at Lipstadt (Liebstadt). With 14,000 men he clashed with Bernadotte again at Mohrungen 25th. Markov commanded a cavalry division at Eylau 7/8 February, and was commander of the right wing cavalry, March.

1812 Service
In 1812 Markov was a General Lieutenant commanding the 10th Corps in Tormasov’s 3rd Army of the West 1812. He participated in Kobryn 27 July and Gorodetschna 12 August. Then he served under Chichagov, but was dismissed for incompetence, when it was found that despite his high-rank, his strategising characterised by such basic errors as confusing roads with rivers on maps.

In 1813 he served in Bennigsen's Army of Reserve, and saw action at the blockade of Hamburg.

References

Russian people of the Kościuszko Uprising
Russian commanders of the Napoleonic Wars
Imperial Russian Army generals
1769 births
1828 deaths